Carlo Petrini (Turin, Italy, 6 November 1965) is an Italian scientist and Director of Researh at the Italian National Institute of Health (Istituto Superiore di Sanità, ISS), where he is head of the Bioethics Unit.

Biography
Petrini studied at the University of Turin where he graduated in 1988 with a degree in Biological Sciences. The year after he began at the Istituto Superiore di Sanità (ISS) where he developed an interest in problems tied to ethics in scientific research, in particular in the biomedical ethics.

Petrini is Chair of the National Ethics Committee for clinical trials of Public Research Bodies (EPR) and other Public Bodies at the national level(CEN-NEC) (Decree of the Minister for Health 2 March 2022). 

He is Chair (former Deputy Chair) of the “National centre for the coordination of territorial ethics committees for clinical trials of medicines and medical devices for human use” (Decrees of the Minister for Health 19 April 2018 and 27 May 2021).

He is Corresponding Member of the Pontifical Academy for Life and contributor to L'Osservatore Romano.

In 2007 he became Director of the Bioethics Unit at ISS.

The President of the Council of Ministers appointed Carlo Petrini as member of the National Bioethics Committee.

He is Deputy President of the Clinical Ethics Committee of the Bambino Gesù Hospital.

Petrini is also coordinator of National and International level research projects in the bioethical field. In his field, Petrini was nominated to serve on the following official commissions and committees:

Ad hoc working group for the correct interpretation of art. 21 of the “Convention on Human Rights and Biomedicine" of the Council of Europe
National Advisory Technical Group on Vaccinations (NITAG) of the Italian Ministry of Health
Commission on Hematopoietic Cord Blood Stem Cells (Decree of the Minister for Health, 20 February 2007)
Experts’ Panel for the Italian National Health Council
Italian National Transplant Centre
Joint Commission National Bioethics Committee – National Committee for Biosecurity, Biotechnology and Life Sciences (Presidency of the Council of Ministers)
Commission of experts for the periodical revision of the list of illnesses in which the use of stem cell transplants is scientifically established (Decree of the Minister for Health 9 November 2009)
Council of Europe.

He is a member of the ethics committees of various institutions, among those the National Agency for New Technologies, Energy, and the Environment (Agenzia Nazionale per le Nuove Tecnologie, l’Energia e lo Sviluppo Economico Sostenibile, ENEA). He is a member of other commissions and committees which include the National Commission for the Program of Crossover Kidney Transplant, the Commission for the Definition of Criteria for Kidney Allocation, and the Interdepartmental Group of Oncology at the ISS. 
He is Coordinator of the Working Group for Activities relating to the research integrity of the ISS.
He is also member of the advisory committees of various journals in the bioethical sector. 

Petrini has provided bioethical consultation for several prestigious institutions including: Italian National Blood Centre; Italian Superior Council of the Magistracy; European Science Foundation; Italian Data Protection Authority; Pontifical Council for Justice and Peace; United Nations Educational Scientific and Cultural Organization (UNESCO); Istituto della Enciclopedia Italiana “Giovanni Treccani”.
Petrini is currently a lecturer in the Bioethics Department of the University Regina Apostolorum and in the past a contracted Bioethics professor in the Medicine Department at the Catholic University of the Sacred Heart.

Works
Petrini is author of several hundred publications, most of which in internationally rated scientific journals and several of which have been awarded prizes. His book "Bioethics, environment, risk" won the International Peccei Prize. His book "Bioetica nella sanita" ("Bioethics in health care") is composed of articles originally published in L'Osservatore Romano, the newspaper of the Holy See. The President of the Italian Constitutional Court, Francesco Paolo Casavola, defined the book as ''the most up-to-date contribution to the knowledge of the recent evolution of the interconnections between the progress of medical research and their use in therapy and clinical practice, together with the acquisition of a bioethical culture on the part of everyone, authors and actors involved in the commitment to safeguard human health".

References

External links
Istituto Superiore di Sanità website
Carlo Petrini website
Carlo Petrini page in ORCID

1965 births
Living people
Scientists from Turin
University of Turin alumni
Bioethicists